Novoozerne is an urban-type settlement in the Yevpatoria municipality of the Autonomous Republic of Crimea, a territory recognized by a majority of countries as part of Ukraine and incorporated by Russia as the Republic of Crimea. Population:  6,108 as of the 2001 Ukrainian Census, and 7,242 in 2011.

The settlement was founded in 1971. It received the status of an urban-type settlement in 1977.

See also
 Southern Naval Base (Ukraine)

References

External links
 

Yevpatoria Municipality
Urban-type settlements in Crimea
Populated places established in 1971